Sermon on the Rocks is the eighth full-length studio album, by singer/songwriter Josh Ritter. It was released October 16, 2015 on Pytheas Recordings.

Ritter described the record as "messianic oracular honky-tonk."

Background 
American singer-songwriter Josh Ritter released his sixth full-length studio album, The Beast in Its Tracks, on March 5, 2013, via Pytheas Recordings. The album, inspired by Ritter's 2011 divorce from fellow musician Dawn Landes, intentionally ended on a hopeful note, as Ritter told Boston, "I do believe that in all my records, I've never ended it on a 'down' note. I just don't believe in it. I want to leave a little fire to carry on into the next record."

Critical reception

NPR's Stephen Thomson said the album contains "some of Ritter's slipperiest, nimblest wordplay" and Jonathan Bernstein of Rolling Stone commented that the record used "Eighties textures" and "vivid character sketches" to yield a very different result from its predecessor, The Beast in Its Tracks.

Track listing
All songs written by Josh Ritter.

"Birds of the Meadow" – 3:15
"Young Moses" – 4:08
"Henrietta, Indiana" – 3:43
"Getting Ready To Get Down" – 3:16
"Seeing Me Round" – 4:58
"Where the Night Goes" – 3:49
"Cumberland" – 2:17
"Homecoming" – 5:31
"The Stone" – 3:55
"A Big Enough Sky" – 2:47
"Lighthouse Fire" – 3:12
"My Man on a Horse (is Here)" – 3:50

Personnel

Musicians
 Josh Ritter — acoustic and electric guitar, lead and harmony vocals
 Zachariah Hickman — upright and electric bass, acoustic and classical guitar, percussion, vocals
 Matt Barrick — drums, percussion, vocals
 Sam Kassirer — piano, electric piano, clavinet, synthesizer, Hammond and Farfisa organs, percussion, vocals
 Josh Kaufman — acoustic, electric, 12-string Rickenbacker and slide guitar, electric mandolin, bongos, vocals
 Trina Shoemaker — percussion

Production
 Recorded at The Parlor, New Orleans, January 5–17, 2015
 Produced by Trina Shoemaker and Josh Ritter
 Recorded by Trina Shoemaker with Eric Heigel
 Mixed by Trina Shoemaker
 Mastered by Jeff Lipton at Peerless Mastering
 Assistant Mastering Engineer: Maria Rice

Charts

References

External links
Josh Ritter official website
Lyrics

Josh Ritter albums
2015 albums